Moulder or variation, may refer to:

 Spindle moulder, a tool
 Mouldmaker, a job
 A device for or a person who performs moulding (process)
 To cover in mould (fungus)
 Moulder Peak, Mount Rosenthal, Liberty Hills, Heritage Range, Antarctica
 Anniston Moulders, Anniston, Alabama, USA; a minor league baseball team

People with the surname
 Alan Moulder (born 1959), British record producer
 Edwin Moulder (1873–1942), Guyanese cricketer
 Glen Moulder (1917–1994), U.S. baseball player
 Helen Moulder (born 1947), New Zealand actress
 Henry Moulder (1883–1967), Australian politician
 James W. Moulder (1921–2011), American microbiologist
 John Moulder (1881–1933), British cricketer
 Kevin Moulder (born 1980), U.S. basketball coach
 Morgan M. Moulder (1904–1976), U.S. politician
 Robin Moulder (born 1966), U.S. musician
 Thomas Moulder (1872–1920), Guyanese cricketer
 John Moulder-Brown (born 1953), British actor
 John Moulder Wilson (1837–1919), U.S. soldier

See also

 
 Maulder, the botanical author abbreviation for Ricky G. Maulder
 Peter Maulder, a New Zealand athlete at the 1998 Oceania Junior Athletics Championships
 Muldaur (surname)
 Mulder (surname)
 Molder (disambiguation)
 Mould (disambiguation)